Buscando a Timbiriche, La Nueva Banda was a Mexican reality show set to look for the new, re-make of the '80s and '90s Mexican band Timbiriche, hosted by Galilea Montijo. The show premiered on June 24, 2007, in Mexico on Canal de las Estrellas and on July 1, 2007 in the United States on Univision a week later from its original live air in Mexico. The show concluded on October 14, 2007, in Mexico, having Brisia, Fernanda, Alberto, Gaby, Eduardo, Taide, and Yurem as the seven new members of the brand new re-made band Timbiriche. Their first CD was released on November 30, 2007. The band announced their decision to split at their final concert in Nuevo Laredo in May 2009.

Contestants
The red color on contestants signifies their expulsion from the show.
The blue signifies the 7 winners of the show.

Format

Participants
30 participants (15 guys and 15 girls) ranging from ages 15–22 were chosen to enter the reality show and will live in "Escuela Timbiriche (Timbiriche School)".

Judging
Each week each will be scored on their singing and dancing performance by 3 tables of judges. The scores range from 1-10.

Honor Roll
From episodes 1-9, the 6 contestants (3 guys and 3 girls) that receive the highest GPA will be placed in the "Cuadro de Honor (Spanish for Honor Roll)". And the 2 that come in first will receive a special privilege for the week.  Starting from episode 10, there will be only one scoreboard (for all contestants, guys and girls), and the top two will compete to be selected as a new member of the new band.

Reported
On the other hand, from episodes 1-9 the bottom 3 males and the bottom 3 females that receive the lowest GPA will be "Reportado (Reported)" and will be up for expulsion from the show.

Starting from episode 10 until the 14th, all contestants were reported. Since the 14th, no remaining contestant was eliminated, therefore no more reported students.

Expulsions
From episodes 1-9, on the day of the expulsions, two of the six Reported will be saved by the Timbiriche Council.
The four still Reported will depend on the public vote, the two that receive the higher number of votes will be saved and the other two will be expelled. Starting from episode 10 until the 14th, the student at the bottom of the overall scoreboard (with the lower GPA and public votes) will be automatically expelled at the end of each episode.

Total number of members
The show was supposed to end with three guys and three girls as the new members of the newly re-made Timbiriche, but after much consideration of the show and the original members of the band, the newly formed band consists of seven members, with the final members being four girls and three guys.

Prize

The chosen members of the band will not only receive a record deal, but will go on tour throughout Mexico and starr in a telenovela (Mexican soap opera).

Judges

Creators
These are the people that in their own ways helped create Timbiriche:
 Marco Flavio Cruz
 Martha Zavaleta
 Luis de Llano
 Amparo Rubín (who replaced Memo Méndez Guiú)

Consejo Timbiriche (Timbiriche Council)
These are the original members of Timbiriche (except Paulina Rubio) and each will have a vote.

Benny Ibarra
Alix Bauer
Erik Rubín
Sasha Sokol
Diego Schoening
Mariana Garza

Table of Fans
This is made up of lifelong fans of the original band. They, as a group, cast one vote for each contestant.

Honor Roll
These are the results that were announced at the end of each episode of Timbiriche''.

Ep 10 - This was the first episode to have two (Alberto and Gaby) in  Honor Roll, due to changed rules. Gaby, Brissia and Sophia were tied in points (8,8), but Gaby got the lead due to decimals (8,875)
Ep 11 - There was no honor roll in this episode. The contestants had limited appearance in spite of 'Copa Timbiriche VIP'.
Ep 12 - As of this episode, the considered Honor Roll are the two people with the highest points and that will face off to become a member.

Reported
The reported are announced at the end of each show, while the expulsions are held the following week. The Timbiriche Council saves two contestants first, then the public vote results are revealed toward the end of the show and announce who stays and who is expelled.

 Ep 6 -  David was put up for expulsion the night of the results due to behavior issues towards Mariana, a current contestant, not to mention Mariana felt he had touched her indecently.

 Ep 11 -  There were no expulsions on this episode

Results

Ep 5 - Jorge was put up for expulsion after an incident that happened and was his second warning, therefore putting him up for expulsion the night of the results.

•	Ep 14 - * From this episode on, there will be no more expulsions.

Episode 16

Results
This episode featured the competition for the last 3 spots in the band, with 6 contestants remaining, the three that do not make the band are automatically eliminated.

References

External links
 The Official Show Website 
 The Contestants 
 Unofficial Blog
 La Nueva Banda Fansite
 Gaby Sanchez Fansite
 Fansite de Sophia, uno de los concursantes

Mexican reality television series
Las Estrellas original programming
Timbiriche